The Solomon Islands made its Paralympic Games début at the 2012 Summer Paralympics in London, sending a single wheelchair athlete (Hellen Saohaga) to compete in the shot put.

Full results for the Solomon Islands at the Paralympics

See also

 Solomon Islands at the Olympics

References